Bloxham  was the oldest Irish stockbroking firm and were members of both the Irish and London Stock Exchanges. It was a founder member of the Irish Stock Exchange.

Bloxham was the oldest stockbroking firm in Ireland and could trace its roots back over 150 years.

Bloxham operated across three regions with an office in the Irish Financial Service Centre in Dublin, Limerick and claimed to be Ireland's largest independent stockbroker, with most of its clients (by number) being retail investors.  The firm provided both stockbroking and wealth management services to private and institutional clients.

A liquidator was appointed in June 2012. Davy Group later acquired the private client business of Bloxhams.

References

Financial services companies based in Dublin (city)